The Big Swap is a 1998 British drama film written and directed by Niall Johnson.  It discusses the exchanging sexual partners for one night between bunch of friends and how it affects their lives.

Plot 
A group of friends meet and plan to swap partners for one night. Every man brings his car key and they all throw it in a bunch of bowl and mix it up. Then the women picks up blindfolded one of the car keys and has to spend a night with whoever's owner of that car key. It's all fun and games at first, but after the party they all begin to regret their choices and the direction of their lives.

Cast 
 Mark Adams as Sam
 Sorcha Brooks as Ellen
 Mark Caven as Michael
 Alison Egan as Eve
 Richard Cherry as Hal
 Julie-Ann Gillitt as Liz
 Anthony Edridge as Jack
 Clark Hayes as Fi
 Thierry Harcourt as Tony
 Jackie Sawiris as Sydney
 Kevin Howarth as Julian

Release 
The Big Swap was released 12 June 1998.

Reception 
Brendan Kelly of Variety wrote, "Partner-swapping may be a catchy concept to start with, but The Big Swap simply isn't sexy enough, nor does it have enough post-coital emotional resonance to maintain interest over its two-hour running time."  Jessica Mellor of Empire rated it 2/5 stars and wrote, "Even with lots of shagging and some hilariously cringe-making moments, the climax ironically comes much too soon and leaves the viewer feeling frustrated rather than satisfied."  Total Film rated it 2/5 stars and wrote, "[T]his low-budget Brit flick fails to ignite, held back by rudimentary production values and bland characters."

References

External links 
 

1998 films
1998 drama films
British drama films
1990s English-language films
1990s British films